Marguerite Corr Quinn is a former member of the Pennsylvania House of Representatives, representing the 143rd legislative district. She was first elected in 2006.

With roots in Philadelphia, Marguerite Corr moved to Doylestown with her family when she was eight years old. She attended Archbishop Wood Catholic High School, graduating in 1981 as valedictorian, and earned a degree in International Relations from St. Joseph’s University.

References

External links

Pennsylvania House of Representatives - Marguerite Quinn

Living people
Saint Joseph's University alumni
American marketing people
Marketing women
Republican Party members of the Pennsylvania House of Representatives
Women state legislators in Pennsylvania
21st-century American politicians
21st-century American women politicians
Year of birth missing (living people)